The Saar Offensive was the French invasion of Saarland, Germany, in the first stages of World War II, from 7 to 16 September 1939. The original plans called for 40 divisions, and one armored division, three mechanised divisions, 78 artillery regiments and 40 tank battalions to assist Poland, which was then under invasion, by attacking Germany's neglected western front. Despite 30 divisions advancing to the border (and in some cases across it), the attack did not have the expected result. When the swift victory in Poland allowed Germany to reinforce its lines with homecoming troops, the offensive was halted. French forces then withdrew amid a German counter-offensive on 17 October.

Background
In 1921, the French Army and the Polish Army made a defensive alliance against Germany in their military convention.

Objective of the offensive
According to the convention, the French Army was to start preparations for the major offensive three days after mobilisation started. The French forces were to effectively gain control over the area between the French border and the Siegfried Line and were to probe the German defences. The sector was defended by the German 1st Army. On the 15th day of the mobilisation (that is on 16 September), the French Army was to start a full-scale assault on Germany. The pre-emptive mobilisation was started in France on 26 August and on 1 September, full mobilisation was declared.

French mobilisation suffered from an inherently out of date system, which greatly affected their ability to swiftly deploy their forces on the field. The French command still believed in the tactics of World War I, which relied heavily on stationary artillery, even though this took time to transport and deploy. Many pieces also had to be retrieved from storage before any advance could be made.

French operations

Almost everyone expected a major French attack on the Western Front soon after the start of the war, but Britain and France were cautious as both feared large German air attacks on their cities; they did not know that 90 per cent of German frontline aircraft were in Poland. A French offensive in the Rhine valley began on 7 September, four days after France declared war on Germany. The Wehrmacht was engaged in the attack on Poland and the French enjoyed a decisive numerical advantage along the border with Germany but the French did not take any action that was able to assist the Poles. Eleven French divisions, part of the Second Army Group, advanced along a  near Saarbrücken, against weak German opposition. Four Renault R35 tanks were destroyed by mines north of Bliesbrück.

By 9 September the French occupied most of the Warndt Forest. On 10 September, while a minor German counterattack retook the village of Apach, French forces reversed the loss only hours later. The French 32nd Infantry Regiment made further gains on 12 September, seizing the German town of Brenschelbach with the loss of one captain, one sergeant, and seven privates. Near the meeting point of the French, German, and Luxembourgeois borders, the Schengen bridge was destroyed.

The offensive was halted after French forces had taken the  Warndt Forest, which had been heavily mined by the Germans. The French stopped short of the Siegfried line, although they came within a few kilometres south of it, immediately east of Saarbrücken.

The French held German territory along all of the Rhine-Moselle front, but after the collapse of Poland, General Maurice Gamelin on 21 September ordered French units to return to their starting positions on the Maginot Line. Some French generals, such as Henri Giraud, saw the withdrawal as a wasted opportunity and made known their disagreement with it.

As the withdrawal was taking place, on 28 September, a counterattack by the German 18th Infantry Regiment (from the then newly formed 52nd Division) in the area between Bischmisheim and Ommersheim was repelled by French forces.

On 17 October the withdrawal was complete. There had been about 2,000 French casualties (killed, wounded, or sick).

Aftermath

The Polish Army general plan for defence, Plan West, assumed that the allied offensive on the Western Front would provide a significant relief to the Polish front in the East.

However, the limited and half-hearted Saar Offensive did not result in any diversion of German troops. The 40-division all-out assault never materialised. On 12 September, the Anglo-French Supreme War Council gathered for the first time at Abbeville in France. It was decided that all offensive actions were to be halted immediately. General Maurice Gamelin ordered his troops to stop "not closer than 1 kilometre (0.6 miles)" from the German positions along the Siegfried Line. Poland was not notified of this decision. Instead, Gamelin informed Marshal Edward Rydz-Śmigły that half of his divisions were in contact with the enemy, and that French advances had forced the Wehrmacht to withdraw at least six divisions from Poland.

The following day, the commander of the French Military Mission to Poland, General Louis Faury, informed the Polish chief of staff, General Wacław Stachiewicz, that the planned major offensive on the western front had to be postponed from 17 to 20 September.

From 16 to 17 October, the German army, now reinforced with troops returning from the Polish campaign, conducted a counteroffensive that retook the remainder of the lost territory, still held by French covering forces, which withdrew as planned. German reports acknowledged the loss of 196 soldiers, plus 114 missing and 356 wounded. They also claimed that 11 of their aircraft had been shot down as far as 17 October. The French suffered around 2,000 casualties. By then, all French divisions had been ordered to retreat to their barracks along the Maginot Line. The Phoney War had begun.

At the Nuremberg Trials, German military commander Alfred Jodl said that "if we did not collapse already in the year 1939 that was due only to the fact that during the Polish campaign, the approximately 110 French and British divisions in the West were held completely inactive against the 23 German divisions." General Siegfried Westphal stated that if the French had attacked in full force in September 1939 the German army "could only have held out for one or two weeks."

See also 

 List of French military equipment of World War II
 List of German military equipment of World War II

References

Further reading

 
 
 
 

World War II sites in Germany
Battle of France
Battles and operations of World War II
Battles in Saarland
Western European theatre of World War II
1939 in Germany
1939 in France
Conflicts in 1939
World War II invasions
Invasions by France
Invasions of Germany